Anders Sandøe Ørsted Bull (13 September 1817 – 15 April 1907) was a Norwegian civil servant and government minister. He served as acting Minister of the Army in 1875 (twice), 1881 and 1884. He also served as mayor of Oslo in 1877 and 1878.

Background
He was born at Bergen in Hordaland, Norway. He was a son of Chief Justice  Georg Jacob Bull (1785-1854) and Barbara Albertine Ørsted (1783-1865). His mother was a sister of Danish physicist   Hans Christian Ørsted and of Danish jurist Anders Sandøe Ørsted. He was a grandson of Chief Justice Johan Randulf Bull, a grandnephew of Johan Lausen Bull and an uncle of chief physician Edvard Isak Hambro Bull.

Career
In 1835, he became a student at Bergen Cathedral School.  He joined the Ministry of the Army in 1837.  In 1840, he became a legal candidate. He was a representative in 1846, bureau chief in 1850 and expedition secretary in 1854. He was appointed General War Commissioner of the Army in 1860.
In 1875, he was acting Minister of the Army from 26 May to 4 June, and from 6 July to 20 July. He was also acting Minister of the Army from 16 September to 25 September 1881  and from 19 March to 2 April 1884. He later served as the Mayor of Oslo in 1877 and 1878.

Personal life
He was married in 1848 to Caroline Elisabeth Dahl (b. 1822), surviving daughter of the artist Johan Christian Dahl. They had the son Karl Sigwald Johannes Bull who would become Minister of Defence from 1910 to 1912.

References

1817 births
1907 deaths
Government ministers of Norway
Norwegian civil servants
Mayors of Oslo
Place of birth missing
Place of death missing